1998 in Korea may refer to:
1998 in North Korea
1998 in South Korea